Soumiya Labani (born 3 February 1975, in Safi) is a Moroccan long-distance runner, winner of the 23rd edition of the Marrakech Marathon with a time of 2:34:56. Soumiya competed in the marathon at the 2012 Summer Olympics but did not finish the race.

Doping 
Labani tested positive for doping at the 2003 IAAF World Cross Country Championships in Lausanne and received a two-year ban.

References

1975 births
Living people
Doping cases in athletics
Moroccan sportspeople in doping cases
Moroccan female marathon runners
Olympic athletes of Morocco
Athletes (track and field) at the 2012 Summer Olympics
People from Safi, Morocco
World Athletics Championships athletes for Morocco
20th-century Moroccan women
21st-century Moroccan women